Peter Glen Vidmar (born June 3, 1961 in Los Angeles) is an American gymnast and Olympic medalist.

Olympics
At age 18, Peter Vidmar was the youngest member of the bronze medal winning 1979 world championships team. Vidmar qualified for the 1980 Olympic team but did not compete due to the Olympic Committee's boycott of the 1980 Summer Olympics in Moscow, Russia. As consolation, he was one of 461 athletes to receive a Congressional Gold Medal many years later.
At the 1984 Summer Olympic games in Los Angeles, Vidmar won gold medals in the men's all-around team competition and the pommel horse competition, as well as a silver medal in the men's all-around individual gymnastics competition. With a total of three Olympic medals, two golds and a silver, He is one of only three athletes inducted into the U.S. Olympic Hall of Fame twice: first as an individual, then as a member of the historic 1984 U.S. men's gymnastics team. He also was the highest-scoring American gymnast in Olympic history.

UCLA
He is an alumnus of UCLA.  In 1983, Vidmar won the Nissen Award (the "Heisman" of men's gymnastics).

Career
Vidmar hosts the Annual Peter Vidmar Men's Gymnastics Invitational at Brentwood School in Los Angeles. He has been a gymnastics anchor for both CBS and ESPN. He is currently a motivational speaker as well as a co-chairman of the U.S. Olympic Committee Summer Sports Summit. In 1998 Vidmar was inducted into the International Gymnastics Hall of Fame.

Personal
Vidmar is a member of the Church of Jesus Christ of Latter-day Saints.

2012 Olympics
Vidmar was selected to be the chef de mission for the 2012 Olympics, where he would have represented all U.S. athletes and marched in the opening ceremonies. His selection drew criticism from LGBT activists and athletes, including Olympic figure skater Johnny Weir, because in 2008 Vidmar donated money to and publicly campaigned for Proposition 8 that banned same-sex couples from being married in California. Vidmar decided several days after his selection to resign from the appointment. Vidmar said, “I simply cannot have my presence become a detriment to the U.S. Olympic family.”

U.S. Gymnastics
Vidmar was named chairman of the U.S. Gymnastics Board of Directors in December 2008. He left his role at USA Gymnastics in December 2015 to serve as a mission president for the LDS Church in the Australia Melbourne Mission.

References

External links
 Official Website
List of competitive results at Gymn Forum

1961 births
Living people
American male artistic gymnasts
Latter Day Saints from California
Gymnasts at the 1984 Summer Olympics
Gymnasts from Los Angeles
UCLA Bruins men's gymnasts
Olympic gold medalists for the United States in gymnastics
Olympic silver medalists for the United States in gymnastics
American people of Slovenian descent
Medalists at the 1984 Summer Olympics
Congressional Gold Medal recipients
People from Coto de Caza, California
American Mormon missionaries in Australia
21st-century Mormon missionaries
Mission presidents (LDS Church)